Good Shepherd School at Kuriannoor in Thiruvalla Taluk Pathanamthitta district of Kerala, India, was founded by its patron, the late Professor  V. A. Mathen Bose and Shanta Bose.  Set in the pristine ecological-hamlet of Kurianoor village, the school offers education for boys and girls from  kindergarten to grade 12.   The school's motto is : Truth is beauty: beauty truth,  and trains children to become competent, caring and responsible adults.

Affiliation and accreditation
The school is affiliated to  the CISCE, Council for the Indian School Certificate Examinations and its grade -10 students and grade 12 students appear for the exams under the Indian Certificate of Secondary Education

Academic programs
The school has a  play school and Kindergarten.

From the Primary to Middle school, the students study a combination  of Languages, Mathematics, Sciences and Social Sciences.

The Sciences are bifurcated into Physics, Chemistry and Biology. Maths is also offered along with electives,  Commerce& Business studies and Computer Science. Students are  challenged to undertake research activities in all the subjects they study.

At the higher secondary school level the school offers Science (Physics, Chemistry, Biology), Maths and Commerce and Business studies and English, Malayalam, Hindi and English as a special subject.

The school has had visiting faculty of teachers from abroad, especially UK and USA.

SUPW Socially Useful Productive Work
The students take up  Socially Useful Productive Work involving gardening using eco-friendly fertilizers, and work with orphanages and old age homes.

Extra-curricular activities
The school promotes activities including dance, music and martial arts.

External links
CISCE school locator

http://www.goodshepherdkuriannoor.com/

References 

Primary schools in Kerala
High schools and secondary schools in Kerala
Schools in Pathanamthitta district